John Jacob Astor IV (July 13, 1864 – April 15, 1912) was an American business magnate, real estate developer, investor, writer, lieutenant colonel in the Spanish–American War, and a prominent member of the Astor family. He died in the sinking of the RMS Titanic during the early hours of April 15, 1912. Astor was the richest passenger aboard the RMS Titanic and was thought to be among the richest people in the world at that time, with a net worth of roughly $87 million when he died (equivalent to $ billion in ).

Early life, education, and family

John Jacob Astor IV was born on July 13, 1864, at his parents' country estate of Ferncliff in Rhinebeck, New York. He was the youngest of five children and only son of William Backhouse Astor Jr., a businessman, collector, and racehorse breeder/owner, and Caroline Webster "Lina" Schermerhorn, a Dutch-American socialite. His four elder sisters were Emily, Helen, Charlotte, and Caroline ("Carrie").

Jack was a great-grandson of German–American fur-trader John Jacob Astor and Sarah Cox Todd, whose fortune made the Astor family one of the wealthiest in the United States. Astor's paternal grandfather William Backhouse Astor Sr. was a prominent real estate businessman. Through his paternal grandmother, Margaret Alida Rebecca Armstrong, Astor was also a great-grandson of Senator John Armstrong Jr. and Alida Livingston of the Livingston family.  His maternal grandparents were Abraham Schermerhorn, a wealthy merchant, and socialite Helen Van Courtlandt White. His sister Helen's husband was diplomat James Roosevelt "Rosey" Roosevelt, half-brother of President Franklin Delano Roosevelt of the Roosevelt family. Another sister, named Carrie, was a noted philanthropist and the wife of Marshall Orme Wilson (brother of banker Richard Thornton Wilson Jr. and socialite Grace (née Wilson) Vanderbilt). Astor was also a first cousin of William Waldorf Astor, 1st Viscount Astor, with whom his mother had a notorious feud resulting in William's removal to England.

Astor attended St Paul's School in Concord, New Hampshire, and later attended Harvard College. He went by the name "Jack". His ungainly appearance and the perception that he was an aimless dilettante led one newspaper to give him the name "Jack Ass-tor".

Career
Among Astor's accomplishments was A Journey in Other Worlds (1894), a science-fiction novel about life in the year 2000 on the planets Saturn and Jupiter. He also patented several inventions, including a bicycle brake in 1898, a "vibratory disintegrator" used to produce gas from peat moss, and a pneumatic road-improver, and he helped develop a turbine engine.

Like generations of Astors before him, he also made millions in real estate.  In 1897, Astor built the Astoria Hotel, "the world's most luxurious hotel", in New York City, adjoining the Waldorf Hotel owned by Astor's cousin and rival, William. The complex became known as the Waldorf-Astoria Hotel. The Waldorf-Astoria would later be the host location to the U.S. inquiries into the sinking of the RMS Titanic, on which Astor died.

Military service

From 1894 to 1896, he was a colonel on the military staff of New York Governor Levi P. Morton. Shortly after the outbreak of the Spanish–American War in 1898, Astor personally financed a volunteer artillery unit known as the "Astor Battery", which  served in the Philippines. In May 1898, Astor was appointed a lieutenant colonel in the U.S. Volunteers and served as an officer on the staff of Major General William Shafter in Cuba, during the Santiago Campaign. He was later given a brevet (war/temporary promotion) to colonel in recognition of his services.  He was mustered out of the Volunteer Army in November 1898.

During the war, he allowed his yacht Nourmahal to be used by the U.S. government. He appeared in the films President McKinley's Inspection of Camp Wikoff (1898) and Col. John Jacob Astor, Staff and Veterans of the Spanish–American War (1899). As a result of his military service, Astor was entitled to the Spanish Campaign Medal.  After the war, Astor was often referred to as "Colonel Astor."

Astor was a member of several military and hereditary societies. He was an early member of the New York Society of Colonial Wars and was assigned membership number 138. He was also a member of the Military Order of Foreign Wars, Society of the Army of Santiago de Cuba, and the Society of the American Wars of the United States.

Personal life

On February 17, 1891, Astor married socialite Ava Lowle Willing, a daughter of Edward Shippen Willing and Alice Barton. The couple had two children:
 William Vincent Astor (November 15, 1891 – February 3, 1959), businessman and philanthropist
 Ava Alice Muriel Astor (July 7, 1902 – July 19, 1956)

Astor and Willing divorced in November 1909. Compounding the scandal of their divorce was Astor's announcement that he would remarry. At the age of 47, Astor married 18-year-old socialite Madeleine Talmage Force, the sister of real estate businesswoman and socialite Katherine Emmons Force. Their parents were William Hurlbut Force and Katherine Arvilla Talmage. Astor and Force were married in his mother's ballroom at Beechwood, the family's Newport, Rhode Island, mansion. There was also much controversy over their 29-year age difference. His son Vincent despised Force, yet he served as best man at his father's wedding. The couple took an extended honeymoon in Europe and Egypt to wait for the gossip to calm down. Among the few Americans who did not spurn him at this time was Margaret Brown, later fictionalized as The Unsinkable Molly Brown. She accompanied the Astors to Egypt and France. After receiving a call to return to the United States, Brown accompanied the couple back home aboard .

Residence

The land had been purchased piecemeal by his father during the mid 19th century. Astor was born there.

His father's Italianate mansion of 1864 was partly rebuilt in 1904 to designs by Stanford White of McKim, Mead & White. The house retained its conservative exterior, and a separate sports pavilion in the Louis XVI style was built. This was Stanford White's last project before he died.

The "Ferncliff Casino" sports pavilion (later called "Astor Courts") reportedly housed the first residential indoor swimming pool in the U.S., an indoor tennis court with vaulting of Guastavino tile, two squash courts, and guest bedrooms. On the lower level, there was a bowling alley and a shooting range.

Titanic

While traveling, Madeleine Force Astor became pregnant. Wanting the child born in the U.S., the Astors boarded Titanic on her maiden voyage to New York. They embarked in Cherbourg, France, in first class and were the wealthiest passengers aboard. Accompanying the Astors were Astor's valet, Victor Robbins; Mrs. Astor's maid, Rosalie Bidois; and her nurse, Caroline Louise Endres. They also took their pet Airedale, Kitty. The Astors were deeply fond of their dog and had come close to losing her on a previous trip when she went missing in Egypt. Kitty did not survive the sinking. Shortly after Titanic hit the iceberg,  New York lawyer Isaac Frauenthal saw Captain Edward J. Smith advise Astor to awaken his wife, as they might have to take to the boats. Astor informed his wife of the collision but told her the damage did not appear to be serious. Some time later, as the ship's lifeboats for first class were being manned, Astor remained unperturbed; he and his wife played with the mechanical horses in the gymnasium. At some point Astor is thought to have sliced the lining of an extra lifebelt with a pen knife to show his wife its contents, either to prove they were not of use or to reassure her that they were. He even declared: "We are safer here than in that little boat."

When Second Officer Charles Lightoller later arrived on A Deck to finish loading Lifeboat 4, Astor helped his wife, with her maid and nurse, into it. He then asked if he might join his wife because she was in "a delicate condition;" however, Lightoller told him men were not to be allowed to board until all the women and children had been loaded. According to Titanic passenger Archibald Gracie IV, "She was lifted up through the window, and her husband helped her on the other side, and when she got in, her husband was on one side of this window and I was on the other side, at the next window. I heard Mr Astor ask the second officer whether he would not be allowed to go aboard this boat to protect his wife. He said, "No, sir, no man is allowed on this boat or any of the boats until the ladies are off." Mr. Astor then said (something to the effect of) "Well, tell me the number of this boat so I may find her afterwards" and was told "Number 4." A news article posted in the Chicago Record Herald tells of Astor placing his wife into the final lifeboat then ordering Ida Sophia Hippach and her 17-year-old daughter Jean Gertrude to take the final two places before the boat was lowered away.

After Lifeboat 4 was lowered at 1:55 am, Astor is said to have stood alone while others tried to free the remaining collapsible boats; he was last seen alive on the starboard bridge wing, smoking a cigarette with Jacques Futrelle. A mere half hour later, the ship disappeared beneath the ocean. Madeleine Force Astor, her nurse, and her maid survived. Colonel Astor, his valet, Victor Robbins, Kitty, and Futrelle did not.

In the aftermath, ships were sent out to retrieve the bodies from the site of the sinking; of the 1,517 passengers and crew who perished in the sinking, only 333 bodies were ever recovered. Astor's body was recovered on April 22 by the cable ship . Astor was identified by the initials sewn on the label of his jacket. Among the items found on him was a gold pocket watch, which his son Vincent claimed and wore the rest of his life.

In his memoir, Gracie claimed that he heard Astor's body was in a crushed condition. This led to popular belief that Astor was killed by the first funnel falling from the ship. Other reports were inconsistent: Captain Richard Roberts, the commander of Astor's yacht, said that apart from some slight discolouration by water, Astor's features were unharmed; however, Gerald Ross, an electrician on the Mackay-Bennett, reported that Astor's "face was swollen, one jaw was injured." Survivor Philip Mock was quoted as claiming to have seen Astor in the water clinging to a raft with William Thomas Stead. "Their feet became frozen," said Mock, "and they were forced to release their hold. Both were drowned."

Astor was buried in Trinity Church Cemetery in Manhattan, New York City. Four months after Titanic sank, Madeleine Astor gave birth to his second son, John Jacob "Jakey" Astor VI.

Estate

Astor left $69 million of his $85 million estate (equivalent to approximately $1.75 billion in 2017 dollars) to Vincent. This value included his Ferncliff country estate in Rhinebeck, New York, and his yacht, the Noma.

To Madeleine Force Astor, he left $100,000 as an outright bequest, as well as a $5 million trust fund from which she was provided an income. Additionally, she was given the use of his New York City mansion (840 Fifth Avenue in Manhattan) and all its furnishings, his Newport mansion (Beechwood) and all its furnishings, the pick of whichever luxury limousine she wanted from his collection, and five of his prized horses—as long as she did not remarry.

His daughter Ava (who lived with her mother, also named Ava) received a $10 million trust fund. Upon turning 21, John Jacob VI inherited the $3 million trust fund Astor had set aside for him.

Legacy
According to Walter Lord, "After [the Titanic] sank, the New York American broke the news on April 16 with a lead devoted almost entirely to John Jacob Astor; at the end it mentioned that 1800 others were also lost." Astor's prominence led to the creation of many exaggerated and unsubstantiated accounts about his actions during the sinking of the Titanic. One story alleges that he opened the ship's kennel and released the dogs, including his own beloved Airedale, Kitty; in another, he placed a woman's hat on a boy to make sure the child was able to get into a lifeboat. Another legend claims that after the ship hit the iceberg, he quipped, "I asked for ice, but this is ridiculous." These stories appeared in newspapers, magazines, and even books about the sinking. In reality, none of the claims about Astor's actions were substantiated, as nobody who recognized him survived other than the women who boarded lifeboats relatively early on. Wade wrote that the ice joke is almost certainly apocryphal, as Astor was not known for making jokes, and that the story about the hat (like many other "survivor stories" published shortly after the sinking) may have been invented by the reporter.

In popular culture
Astor's fame has made him a frequent character in media, literary, and stage works, especially in stories about the Titanic. German actor Karl Schönböck played Astor in the 1943 Nazi propaganda film Titanic. William Johnstone played Astor in the 1953 film Titanic, and in the 1997 version of Titanic he was played by Eric Braeden. In the 1996 miniseries, he was played by Canadian-born actor Scott Hylands. Astor was also portrayed by David Janssen in the 1979 film S.O.S. Titanic. He was played by Miles Richardson in the 2012 Titanic miniseries. Astor was portrayed by his great-grandson Gregory Todd Astor in an April 2012 production of Titanic: The Musical.

References

External links

 
 
 
 
 Funeral of Col. Astor at news.hrvh.org

1864 births
1912 deaths
19th-century American businesspeople
19th-century American inventors
19th-century American male writers
19th-century American novelists
20th-century American businesspeople
20th-century American inventors
20th-century American male writers
20th-century American novelists
 American company founders 
American military personnel of the Spanish–American War
American investors
American hoteliers
American patent holders
American science fiction writers
John Jacob
Burials at Trinity Church Cemetery
Businesspeople from New York City
 Businesspeople from Newport, Rhode Island
Gilded Age
Deaths on the RMS Titanic
Harvard College alumni
Hotel founders
Inventors from New York (state)
Inventors from Rhode Island
Livingston family
New York (state) Republicans
 Novelists from New York (state)
Novelists from Rhode Island
People from Rhinebeck, New York
People from the Upper East Side
People included in New York Society's Four Hundred
St. Paul's School (New Hampshire) alumni
Schermerhorn family
United States Army colonels
Writers from Manhattan
Writers from Newport, Rhode Island